The following is a timeline of the history of Lynn, Massachusetts, USA.

17th-18th century
 1629 - Saugus founded.  Among the founders — Edmund Ingalls
 1637 - Saugus renamed to Lynn in honor of Reverend Samuel Whiting (Senior), Lynn's first official minister who arrived from King's Lynn.
 1642 - Saugus Iron Works in business.
 1644 - Reading separates from Lynn.
 1720 - Lynnfield burying-ground established.
 1732 - Saugus burying-ground established.
 1782 - Lynnfield separates from Lynn.
 1793 - Post office in operation.
 1797 - Population: 2,291.

19th century
 1803 - Floating Bridge constructed on Salem-Boston turnpike.
 1810 - Population: 4,087.
 1812 - Eastern Burial-Place established.
 1814 - Town House built.
 1815
 Saugus separates from Lynn.
 Social Library formed.

 1830 - Lynn Record newspaper begins publication.
 1838
 Eastern Railroad in operation.
 Lynn Natural History Society formed.
 1840 - Population: 9,367.
 1841
 Lyceum building constructed.
 Frederick Douglass moves to Lynn.
 September 28 - Frederick Douglass is thrown off the Eastern Railroad train at Lynn Central Square station for refusing to sit in the segregated coach
 1845 Frederick Douglass writes his first autobiography Narrative of the Life of Frederick Douglass, an American Slave while living in Lynn
 1847 - High Rock Cottage (also called "Stone Cottage") is built by Alonzo Lewis for Jesse Hutchinson
 1848 - First High Rock Tower built.
 1850
 May 14 - City of Lynn incorporated.
 George Hood becomes mayor.
 Pine Grove Cemetery consecrated.
 1851 - First High School built.
 1852
May - Swampscott separates from Lynn.
June - Benjamin Franklin Mudge becomes mayor.
 1853
February - Saugus Branch Railroad opens for passengers with four stations in Lynn. Lynn's Andrews Breed is the railroad's first superintendent.
March - Nahant separates from Lynn.
April - Daniel C. Baker becomes mayor.

 1854 - Lynn Weekly Reporter newspaper begins publication.
 1855
Andrews Breed becomes mayor.
Lynn Library Association organized.
 1856
Ezra W. Mudge becomes mayor.
African Methodist Episcopal Church established.
 1858
 William F. Johnson becomes mayor.
 Telegraph in service.
 St. Mary's Cemetery consecrated.
 1859 - Edward S. Davis becomes mayor.
 1860 - New England Shoemakers Strike of 1860 begins in Lynn
 1861 - Hiram N. Breed becomes mayor.
 1862
Peter M. Neal becomes mayor.
Free Public Library established.
 1863 - Boston & Lynn Horse Railroad begins operating.
 1865
 April 19 - original High Rock Tower destroyed by fire
 1866
Roland G. Usher becomes mayor.
 Mary Baker Eddy experiences the fall in Lynn, believed by Christian Scientists to mark the birth of their religion.

 1867
 City Hall dedicated.
 Lynn Transcript newspaper begins publication.
 1868 - Young Men's Christian Association organized.
 1870
Edwin Walden becomes mayor.
Music Hall opens.
 1872
 Labor strike by shoemakers.
James N. Buffum becomes mayor.
Odd Fellows Hall built.
Boston, Revere Beach & Lynn Railroad chartered.
 1873
Jacob M. Lewis becomes mayor.
Soldiers' Monument installed.
 1876 - Lynn City Item newspaper begins publication.
1877 - Samuel M. Bubier becomes mayor.

 1879
January - George Plaisted Sanderson becomes mayor.
June - 250th anniversary of settlement.
 1880 - Lynn Masonic Hall built.
 1881
 Henry B. Lovering elected mayor.
 Lynn Woods established.
 St. Stephen's Memorial Episcopal Church built.
 Saint Mary's Boys High School established.

1882 - Lynn's Henry B. Lovering is elected to the United States House of Representatives.
 1883
 William L. Baird becomes mayor.
 Thomson-Houston Electric Company in business.
 1885
 John R. Baldwin becomes mayor.
 G.A.R. Hall built.
 1886 - George D. Hart becomes mayor.
 1887
 English High School established.
 Henry Cabot Lodge becomes Massachusetts's 6th congressional district representative.
 1888
 March 11–14 Lynn and all of Massachusetts are crippled by the Great Blizzard of 1888
 George C. Higgins becomes mayor.
 Thomson-Houston Electric Company powers the first electric streetcar in Massachusetts: the Highland Circuit of the Lynn & Boston Railway Company
 1889
 Asa T. Newhall becomes mayor.
 A fire sweeps through the downtown, destroying a large swath of commercial and retail space.
 1890 - Fabens Building and Tapley Building constructed.
 1891
E. Knowlton Fogg becomes mayor.
Lynn Bank Block and Mowers' Block built.
 1892
Elihu B. Hayes becomes mayor.
General Electric formed by a merger of Edison General Electric Company of Schenectady, New York and Thomson-Houston Electric Company of Lynn.
 Lynn English High School on Essex Street opens
Lynn Classical High School opened.
 1893 - Lynn Armory built.

 1894 - Charles E. Harwood becomes mayor.
 1895 - Boston and Maine's Central Square station rebuilt.
 1896
Eugene A. Besson becomes mayor.
Post Office built.
 1897
Walter L. Ramsdell becomes mayor.
Lynn Historical Society incorporated.
 1898 - Lynn Public Library built.
 1899 - William Shepherd becomes mayor.

20th century

 1900 - Population: 68,513.
 1903
Henry W. Eastham becomes mayor.
Vamp Building constructed.
 1904
 second High Rock Tower constructed 
 1905
 St. Michael the Archangel Parish established.
 431 factories in Lynn.
 1906 -  Charles Neal Barney becomes mayor.
 1907 Lynndyl, Utah, a town named after Lynn, is founded.
 1908 - Thomas F. Porter becomes mayor.
 1909 - James E. Rich becomes mayor.
 1910 - Population: 89,336.
 1911 - William P. Connery, Sr. becomes mayor.
 1913
George H. Newhall becomes mayor.
Chamber of Commerce established.

 1916 - James Street addition to the original Lynn English High School opens
 1918 - Walter H. Creamer becomes mayor.

 1921 - Bridge rebuilt on Salem-Boston turnpike.
 1922
Harland A. McPhetres becomes mayor.
Lynn's William P. Connery, Jr. is elected to the United States House of Representatives.
 1924
 March 29 - Fire destroys the 1892 portion of the original Lynn English High School
 1926 - Ralph S. Bauer becomes mayor.

 1928 - An explosion at the Preble Box Toe Company factory kills 20.

 1930
 Population: 102,320.
 J. Fred Manning becomes mayor.

 1933 - United States Post Office–Lynn Main built.
 1937
March 28 - Highland Circuit electric streetcar line (first electric trolley in Massachusetts) is converted to motor bus operations
June - Congressman William P. Connery, Jr. dies.
September - Lawrence J. Connery elected to fill his late brother's Congressional seat.
November 24 - Manning Bowl stadium opens.
 1938 - Capitol Diner in business.
 1940
Albert Cole becomes mayor.
 Fraser Field opens.
 1943
River Works plant opens.
Mayor Albert Cole resigns to serve in U.S. Army. Arthur J. Frawley becomes acting mayor.
 1944
Arthur J. Frawley elected mayor.
 1946
 Albert Cole becomes mayor.
 Lynn Red Sox baseball team active.

 1947
Lynn Vocational and Technical Institute established (approximate date).
WLYN goes on the air.
 1949
 City Hall built.
 Lynn Tigers baseball team active.
 1948 - Stuart A. Tarr becomes mayor.
 1952
Arthur J. Frawley becomes mayor.
Boston and Maine's Central Square station rebuilt.
 1953 - Lynn's Harry Agganis signs with the Boston Red Sox.
 1955 - Harry Agganis dies at the age of 26.
 1956 - Thomas P. Costin, Jr. becomes mayor.
 1959 - The Chicago Bears defeat the Philadelphia Eagles 24–21 in the Cardinal Cushing Charity Game held at the Manning Bowl.
 1960 - Lynn Sunday Post begins publication.
 1961
July - Mayor Thomas P. Costin, Jr. resigns to become Postmaster of Lynn. M. Henry Wall becomes acting mayor.
November - M. Henry Wall elected mayor.
 1963 - WBWL begins broadcasting.
1965 - North Shore Community College established
 1966
Irving E. Kane becomes mayor.
The Rolling Stones kick off their North American Tour at the Manning Bowl.
 1970 - J. Warren Cassidy becomes mayor.
 1972
January - Pasquale Caggiano becomes mayor.
April - Pasquale Caggiano dies. Walter F. Meserve becomes acting mayor.
July - Antonio J. Marino becomes mayor.
Plans to construct Interstate 95 through Lynn and Lynn Woods Reservation are scrapped
 1974 - David L. Phillips becomes mayor.
 1975
Lynn's Thomas W. McGee becomes Speaker of the Massachusetts House of Representatives
Great Stew Chase footrace begins.
 1976 - Antonio J. Marino becomes mayor.
 1980 - Lynn Sailors baseball team formed.
 1981 - November - Fire levels approximately three square blocks of the downtown, destroying 17 buildings
 1982 - Lynn Sailors relocate to Burlington, Vermont.
 1986 - Albert V. DiVirgilio becomes mayor.
 1990 - The Bay State Titans, a semi-pro football team, is established. The team's Defensive Tackle, Eric Swann, would be selected with the sixth overall pick in the 1991 NFL Draft.
 1992
Patrick J. McManus becomes mayor.
Central Square - Lynn MBTA station rebuilt.
 1999 - New Lynn Classical High School building opened.

21st century

 2001 - City website online (approximate date).
 2002 - Edward J. Clancy, Jr. becomes mayor.
 2003 - North Shore Spirit baseball team begins play.
 2004 - KIPP Lynn Academy opens.
 2005 - Manning Bowl is demolished and replaced by Manning Field.
 2007 - North Shore Spirit cease operations.
 2008 - North Shore Navigators baseball team relocates to Lynn.
 2010
 Population: 90,329.
 Judith Flanagan Kennedy becomes Lynn's first female mayor.
 2011 - KIPP Academy Lynn Collegiate (High School) holds its first class.
 2012 - KIPP Academy Lynn opens doors the Highlands.
 2014 - Seasonal ferry service to/from Boston is established

 2016 - Ferry service is suspended
 2017 - Ferry service resumes
 2018
 200th birthday of Frederick Douglass is celebrated throughout the year
 Thomas M. McGee becomes mayor
 Ferry service is suspended
 2021
 August 18: The Frederick Douglass Park is dedicated, directly across the street from the site of the Central Square railroad depot where Douglass was forcibly removed from the train in 1841.
 2022
 January 3: Jared C. Nicholson is sworn in as the 58th Mayor

See also
 Lynn history
 List of mayors of Lynn, Massachusetts
 National Register of Historic Places listings in Lynn, Massachusetts
 Timelines of other municipalities in Essex County, Massachusetts: Gloucester, Haverhill, Lawrence, Newburyport, Salem
 History of Massachusetts

References

Bibliography

Published in the 18th-19th century
 
 
 
 
 
 
 
 
 
 
 
 
 

Published in the 20th century

External links

 Works related to Lynn, MA, various dates (via Digital Public Library of America).
 Items related to Lynn, Mass., various dates (via US Library of Congress)
 Maps of Lynn (via Boston Public Library, Map Center)
 Images related to history of Lynn (via Lynn Public Library)

Lynn, Massachusetts
Lynn